David Ambler (born 4 December 1997) is a British rower. He won a gold medal in the coxless four at the 2022 World Championships.

References

External links

1997 births
Living people
British male rowers
World Rowing Championships medalists for Great Britain
21st-century British people